Aurelia (also spelled Aurelía, Aurélia or Aurelija) is a feminine given name from the Latin family name Aurelius, which was derived from aureus meaning "golden".  The name began from minor early saints but was given as a name due to its meaning, and not from where it originated. Aurelia may refer to:

Historical
 A woman of the gens Aurelia of Ancient Rome
 Aurelia Correia, African slave trader
 Aurelia Cotta (120 BC – 54 BC), mother of Julius Caesar
 Aurelia Paulina, 2nd century noblewoman
 Aurelia of Strasbourg, 4th century saint
 Aurelia of Regensburg (died 1027), Roman Catholic saint

Modern (from 20th century)
 Aurelia Brădeanu (born 1979), Romanian handballer
 Aurelia E. Brazeal (born 1943), American diplomat 
 Aurelia Browder (1919–1971), African-American civil rights activist
 Aurelia Ciurea (born 1982), Romanian aerobic gymnast
 Aurelia Courtney (born 2014), daughter of American Bravo TV stars Nadine Jolie Courtney and Erik Courtney
 Aurelia Dobre (born 1972), Romanian gymnast
 Aurelia Frick (born 1975), Liechtenstein politician, Minister of Foreign Affairs since 2009
 Aurelia Greene (1934–2021), American politician
 Aurelia Harwood (1865–1928), American conservationist
 Aurelia Litsner De Fere (1835–1917), Hungarian musician
 Aurelija Mikušauskaitė (1937–1974), Lithuanian actress
 Aurelia Molins (1582–1641), English midwife
 Aurelia Pentón (born 1941), Cuban track and field athlete
 Aurelia Plath (1906–1994), mother of American poet Sylvia Plath
 Aurelia Henry Reinhardt (1877–1948), American educator
 Aurélia de Souza (1867–1922), Portuguese painter
 Aurelia Tizón (1902–1938), first wife of Argentine president Juan Perón
 Aurelia Trywiańska (born 1976), Polish hurdler

See also
Aurélie

Feminine given names
Romanian feminine given names